Ancylodactylus dickersonae, also known commonly as Dickerson's forest gecko, Dickerson's gecko, and the four-lined forest gecko, is a species of lizard in the family Gekkonidae. The species is endemic to Africa.

Etymology
The specific name, dickersonae, is in honor of American herpetologist Mary Cynthia Dickerson.

Geographic range
A. dickersonae is found in the Democratic Republic of the Congo, Ethiopia, Kenya, Rwanda, South Sudan, Tanzania, and Uganda.

Habitat

Reproduction
A. dickersonae is oviparous.

References

Further reading
Malonza PK, Bauer AM (2022). "Resurrection of the African gecko genus Ancyclodactylus Müller, 1907 (Squamata: Gekkonidae) and description of six new species from Kenya". Zootaxa 5141 (2): 101–139. (Ancyclodactylus dickersonae, new combination).
Michels JP, Bauer AM (2004). "Some Corrections to the Scientific Names of Amphibians and Reptiles". Bonner zoologische Beiträge 52 (1/2): 83–94. (Cnemaspis dickersonae, p. 87, corrected gender of scientific name).
Rösler H (2000). "Kommentierte Liste der rezent, subrezent und fossil bekannten Geckotaxa (Reptilia: Gekkonomorpha)". Gekkota 2: 28–153. (Cnemaspis dickersoni, p. 62). (in German). 
Schmidt KP (1919). "Contributions to the Herpetology of the Belgian Congo Based on the Collection of the American Museum Congo Expedition, 1909–1915. Part I. Turtles, Crocodiles, Lizards, and Chameleons". Bulletin of the American Museum of Natural History 39 (2): 385–624. (Gonatodes dickersoni, new species, p. 436).

Ancylodactylus
Reptiles described in 1919